The mixed team relay event at the 2021 European Road Championships took place on 8 September 2021, in Trentino, Italy.

Participation
Nations were allowed to enter a maximum of one team, composed of six riders (three women and three men), each. Riders could be drawn from the elite or under-23 categories, but not the junior category.

Results
The event started on 8 September 2021, at 14:30.

References

Men's elite
Mixed sports competitions